The city of Ottawa, Canada held municipal elections on December 1, 1924 to elect members of the 1925 Ottawa City Council. It was the second municipal election held in the 1924 calendar year, as the previous election was held on January 7.

Mayor of Ottawa

Ottawa Board of Control
(4 elected)

Ottawa City Council
(2 elected from each ward)

References
The Ottawa Evening Citizen, Dec 2, 1924

Municipal elections in Ottawa
1924 elections in Canada
1920s in Ottawa
1924 in Ontario